The First Football League of Kosovo is the second level of the Kosovar football league system. The First League is organized by the Football Federation of Kosovo and the division currently has 2 groups of 10-teams format. At the end of the season, the bottom two teams in the division are relegated to the third tier, Second Football League of Kosovo.

Names

Clubs (2022–23)

References 

 
2
Kos